Liter of Light is an open source design for a low-cost light tube (or deck prism or vault light) that refracts solar light to provide daytime interior lighting for dwellings with thin roofs. Daylighting is cheaper than using indoor electric lights during the day. The device is simple: a transparent two-liter bottle is filled with water plus a little bleach to inhibit algal growth and fitted into a hole in a roof. The device functions like a deck prism: during daytime the water inside the bottle refracts sunlight, delivering about as much light as a 40–60 watt incandescent bulb to the interior. A properly installed solar bottle can last up to 5 years.

History 
The use of plastic bottles in this way to provide indoor lighting from daylight was developed by Alfredo Moser of Brazil. Using the technology as a social enterprise was first launched in the Philippines by Illac Diaz under the My Shelter Foundation in April 2011. In order to help the idea to grow sustainably, Diaz implemented a "local entrepreneur" business model whereby bottle bulbs are assembled and installed by local people, who can earn a small income for their work. Within months, the organization expanded from one carpenter and one set of tools in one community in San Pedro, Laguna to 15,000 solar bottle bulb installations in twenty cities around the Philippines, and began to inspire local initiatives around the world. MyShelter Foundation also established a training center that conducts workshops with youth, business companies, and other groups who are interested in volunteering their time to build lights in their communities.

In less than a year since inception, over 200,000 bottle bulbs were installed in communities around the world. Liter of Light had a goal to light up 1 million homes by the end of 2015.

Technology description 

The Solar Bottle Bulb, as it has also been called, is installed in the roof of homes with the purpose of refracting sunlight in order to light up a room. The project's innovation lies in its utilization of cheap, durable and readily available materials to produce high quality natural lighting enabling the urban poor to have access to an affordable, environmentally friendly long-term alternative to electric light for use during the day.

1.5-liter bottles are the size most commonly reused for lighting. After being filled with water and a little bleach, the bottle is pushed through a steel sheet that serves as a metal lock to prevent it from slipping. It is then embedded into a corrugated iron roof. A small part of the bottle is left outside while the rest of it protrudes into the house.  Sealant is put around the hole made in the roof to keep it weather proof. The refractive properties of water ensures that the light from the sun that reaches the inside of the bottle becomes omni-directional mimicking an electric light bulb and emitting the same amount of light as a 40–60 W incandescent bulb depending on the amount of solar insolation available.  Adding bleach to the water prevents it from turning green with algae and ensures a high quality light keeping the water clear for a longer time. In order to facilitate use of the invention through open source mechanisms, step-by-step guides on materials and installation are available online.

Glue 

Using an appropriate durable, leak-proof, space-filling glue, that does not melt because of the sun, is one of the main challenges for the solution. Many local groups are experimenting with different glues to find the best solution for both costs and quality. It was usually found that silicone-based or polyurethane glues work best. The inventor, Alfredo Moser, used a polyester resin.

Rigid glass bottles are also used, and may be easier to caulk than flexible plastic bottles. Some caulks react chemically with plastic, slowly making it brittle.

Countries

Argentina 
A local project is underway.

Bangladesh 
Liter of Light Bangladesh was started by Shanjidul Alam Seban Shaan under Lights Foundation in 2015 in Chittagong. They made a local version of the bottle light called 'Botol Bati', which costs around $2–2.50 USD and lasts for 4–5 years. They aim to spread awareness of bottle lights to remote areas by training local school students. Around 45% of Bangladeshi people have no access to electricity, and around 24% of the total population live in slums where people use illegal electricity. Lights Foundation's aim is to serve those people. Liter of Light Bangladesh started spreading the idea in New York and other states.

Brazil
In Brazil, everything started in December 2012, when two Brazilians named Alanna Sousa and Pedro Santos decided to implement the Liter of Light project in Brazil. By 2013, Vitor Belota, coincidentally Alanna's neighbor, had the same impetus to bring Liter of Light to Brazil after learning about the project in Kenya. The trio met and carried out a pilot project, where the first daytime solutions were installed in two communities in Santa Catarina.
In 2015, seeing that the context of the Brazilian communities and also the needs were different, Litro de Luz Brasil (Liter of Light Brazil) started working with the nighttime street light, carrying out its first installation action in June of the same year, in the Vila Beira-Mar Community, located in Rio de Janeiro.
Today, Litro de Luz Brasil is established as a non-profit organization and since then has directly impacted the lives of more than 20,000 Brazilians through more than 3,700 solutions, reaching more than 120 communities across the country.

China
Liter Of Light China was created by three international students from China in 2016, and the first project in Rudong will be conducted in the early summer, 2017.

Colombia 
The movement in Colombia was started by Camilo Herrera in a small town called Duitama in the Boyaca Department, approximately 200 kilometers from Bogota. After launching a pilot in Bogota in collaboration with Liter of Light Switzerland in February 2012, a local Bogota organization was created. The first bottles in Bogota were installed in the areas of Divino Niño and La Colina of Ciudad Bolíva. The volunteers in Bogota are also working closely with Un Techo Para Mi Pais to identify areas in need.

Dominican Republic 
Liter of Light was started up in the Dominican Republic by the German volunteer Nicolai Rapp in 2015 who then distributed the project with other German and local volunteers in over 7 provinces. 
They achieved the installation of bottle and solar nightlights in more than 1000 houses with global fundraising. In the focus of their movement are the rural areas without or with limited access to electricity. 
They also presented the idea of Liter of Light to several local NGO's in seminars and workshops to reach all the off-grid communities of the country. Recently, their efforts also focused on bringing 
the project to Haiti, where around 75% of the population has to live without access to electricity.

Egypt 
A group of seven students from the French University in Egypt (UFE) have begun Liter of Light locally in the context of a social and environmental development project.
In November 2014, PepsiCo announced that they will implement Liter of Light in 3 villages in upper Egypt, with two partners : SunUtions Company for solar solutions and Masr ElKheir organization.

France 
In 2015, Liter of Light France was created. The French branch is developing an important link between pedagogical project in Europe and the international cooperation around the world. The NGO wants in Europe to make the new generation aware of the energy poverty reality and show that they can have, with a small activity, a huge social and environmental impact. The NGO wants, as well, to deliver the message to developing countries that a new generation all around the world are caring about the World Citizenship. During International cooperation, Liter of Light France is underlining the main philosophies of the movement as technological innovation accessible to everybody, capacity building, and initiatives South-South. The movement in France was started by Olivier Lasbouygues, Paola Sierra and Isabel Rico.

India 
Inspired by the project of Isang Litrong Liwanag, Liter of Light was introduced to the people of India by Pradeep Chanti. The first trial was done in Vikarabad, a rural village in Telangana in 2011. With this experience, the team gradually expanded the concept. Later, Mr. Ranjeet Gakhare, an alumnus of Indian Institute of Technology Bombay, Ms. Bhavana Poppoppu and Mr. Chaitanya Reddy from Cornell University joined Pradeep and expanded the concept all over India. With the generous help of several NGOs and various organizations, awareness campaigns and workshops were conducted in various cities like Hyderabad, Mumbai, Chennai, Kolkata, Jalpaiguri, and Delhi. Starting with the one bottle in Vikarabad, the team is not only installing several models in houses of the unprivileged, but also mentoring various other organizations, NGOs, student bodies and the people in need. The demonstration of Liter of Light was conducted at TEDxChristUniversity in November 2012. In 2014 it was carried out by Desire Foundation, Bhubaneswar on the coruscating day of Diwali to celebrate the festival of light in a unique style with the underprivileged.

Kenya 
A youth group called Koch Hope has started to install 2 L PET bottles in the Korogocho slums. At first the people were skeptical that the bottle installations would let in water, so the first bottles were installed in a local school as a test. The locals thus bought into the idea and the first 100 bulbs were installed in April 2011 for free in hopes to attract interest and donors. Next, the local initiative would like to expand to other areas around Nairobi.

Malaysia 
Liter of Light Malaysia ran its first project in June, 2015, and is run by a Malaysia-based social business called Incitement, founded by Zikry Kholil and Daniel de Gruijter, which runs several social initiatives. Liter of Light Malaysia has thus far completed 36 projects, predominantly for marginalized communities in Pahang, Malaysia and the Orang Asli communities living in Cameron Highlands, but also in Sabah and Sarawak in East Malaysia (Borneo). After Incitement launched Liter of Light Malaysia, it has also pushed Liter of Light into the Italian market under the umbrella of Incitement Italy. To date, Liter of Light Malaysia has installed 1850+ solar powered lamps in the rural areas of Malaysia, effectively providing light at night for more than 6,000 underprivileged Malaysians.

Mexico 
Liter of Light began in Mexico in early 2013, sponsored by Qohélet A.C. Founded by Tere Gonzalez, who had previously worked with Liter of Light in India & Spain, the group began operations with a pilot program in the state of Chihuahua México, where they were able to benefit 114 people. As of September 2013, they are working to complete the next phase of installations in Ajusco, Mexico City, to benefit a further 500 families.

Nepal 
"Ujyalo" means "the light" in Nepali. Project Ujyalo creates bottle lights, inspired by the Liter of Light initiative. It was started by the Ujyalo Foundation in Nepal.

Netherlands
Liter of Light Netherlands aims at realizing projects in suitable countries with the purpose of establishing a local Liter of Light sub-organization. Its work is threefold: Prior to the project, the work focuses mainly on gathering information, preparing the projects, promoting and fundraising. During the projects abroad, the project focuses on spreading the idea and inspiring people to get involved with Liter of Light and even starting their own project. Therefore, empowering the partner organization is a major goal and includes holding bottle-building workshops on site and setting up an operational framework. After the project, the partner organizations will be assisted and continuously supported by Liter of Light Netherlands.

Pakistan 
A partnership has been created with Ace Welfare Foundation, Pakistan. According to both of the organizations' objectives, and considering the fact that more than 11% of the Pakistani population lives without access to the electricity, including 50,000 villages that are completely separate from the national grid, it was decided to form a partnership in order to implement the Liter of Light project.

Panama
A local project is underway.

Peru 
A local project is underway.

Philippines 
The solution was first launched in the Philippines by Illac Diaz under the MyShelter Foundation. As of July 2011, the organization had installed 10,000 bottles in the Philippines  and shortly thereafter reached 15,000 installations  and their goal for 2012 is to reach 1 million homes. In order to help the idea to grow sustainably, they have implemented a “local entrepreneur” business model, whereby bottles are put together and installed by locals who can in turn earn a small income for their work. Additionally a Liter of Light office has been established that conducts volunteer workshops.

Spain 
A local project is underway.

Switzerland 
Liter of Light Switzerland began as a project of the SIMagination Challenge at the University of St. Gallen. The project grew and was established as a student club at the University of St. Gallen and as a non-profit organization in Switzerland in November 2011. The organization's first project was to plan and implement a pilot in Bogota together with Litro de Luz Colombia. The pilot took place in February 2012 and together they installed bottles in Ciudad Bolivar, Bogota. Throughout 2012, Liter of Light Switzerland undertook additional projects in Spain, India and Bangladesh.

The Swiss NGO plans to continue sharing lessons learned and spreading the concept via a global platform as well as launching more pilots around the world.

Tanzania 
World Unite! in cooperation with local NGOs has started A Liter of Light in Tanzania in April 2013. Project locations are Dar es Salaam, Moshi/Kilimanjaro and Zanzibar.

Uganda 
A local project is underway.

United States 
Liter of Light USA is committed to educating and raising awareness of Liter of Light and its global outreach. The company is headquartered in New York and frequently holds events and workshops in Manhattan. It maintains its own social media pages on Facebook, Twitter, and LinkedIn.

Zambia 
A local project is underway.

Awards and recognition
 2016: The St Andrews Prize for the Environment
 2015: The Zayed Future Energy Prize
2014:The World Habitat Award

See also
 Anidolic lighting and Daylighting, broader concepts
 Deck prism and Vault light, older glass versions
 Daylight redirecting film
 Glass brick

References

External links
 https://www.bbc.co.uk/news/magazine-23536914 Alfredo Moser: Bottle light inventor proud to be poor - BBC News Magazine 13 Aug 2013
 http://isanglitrongliwanag.org
 http://literoflightswitzerland.org/idea.html
 https://www.youtube.com/watch?v=xhtG5vW1lOw The Philippines: Bottleman (UN in Action episode 1432)

Appropriate technology
International volunteer organizations
Charities based in the Philippines
Organizations established in 2013
Brazilian inventions
Organizations based in Manila